Sotará may refer to
 Sotará, Cauca, a town and municipality in Colombia
 Sotará (volcano), a volcano in Colombia